The 2016–17 Futures League is the 11th season of the Futures League, the domestic second tier cricket competition in Australia.

Points Table

Round-robin

Round 1

Round 2

Round 3

Round 4

Round 5

Round 6

Round 7

Statistics

Most Runs

Most Wickets 

Futures League
Australian domestic cricket competitions